Beurlay is a commune in the French department of Charente-Maritime, in the administrative region of Nouvelle-Aquitaine (before 2015: Poitou-Charentes), France.

Beurlay is twinned with the village of Burley, Hampshire, UK.

It being known for the biscuit factory in the same name, established 1848 by the Barraud family, who produces the Galette Charentaise.

It is located about 17 km (10.5 mi) from Rochefort.

Population

See also
 Communes of the Charente-Maritime department

References

External links
 

Communes of Charente-Maritime